St Luke's Church is a Grade II listed Church of England church on Gibbon Road in Kingston upon Thames, London. Designed by the Leeds architectural firm Kelly & Birchall, it was constructed between 1886 and 1887 by a local building firm, W. H. Gaze.

History

The church was built to serve the railway workers whose houses form the surrounding streets, situated to the north of the railway station in Kingston. The parish was poor but, through the well-connected wife of the first vicar, received sponsorship from society figures, most notably Princess Mary Adelaide of Cambridge, granddaughter of George III and mother of Queen Mary, consort of George V. This allowed for the prominent church which stands today, the spire of which was completed in 1891 following a further donation of funds by Lady Wolverton. 

A painting showing the original design for the church survives. It shows that the building was constructed largely as it was intended by the architects, with only the design of the spire being slightly modified and a clock inserted into the tower. Following extensive research by Justin Lynch and Owen Millard, the painting was discovered on 2 August 2019; it now rests with the vicar of St Luke's Church, Fr Martin.

Present day
St Luke's Church stands in the Traditional Catholic tradition of the Church of England. As the parish rejects the ordination of women, it receives alternative episcopal oversight from the Bishop of Fulham (currently Jonathan Baker).

Services are held on Sunday mornings and evenings, on Tuesday and Thursday mornings and on Wednesday evenings. The vicar is Fr Martin Hislop.

References

External links

 

1886 establishments in England
19th-century Church of England church buildings
Kingston upon Thames
Anglo-Catholic church buildings in London
Anglo-Catholic churches in England receiving AEO
Kingston upon Thames
Churches completed in 1887
Grade II listed buildings in the Royal Borough of Kingston upon Thames
Grade II listed churches in London
History of the Royal Borough of Kingston upon Thames